Rootless, stylized as rootless, was a Japanese band. They were affiliated with LDH and Being Inc.

History 
 In 2009, the band The ROOTLESS was formed. They started performing as street performers.
 On October 20, 2010, they made their major debut with the single "One Day" which was also appointed as the 13th opening song of the anime One Piece.
 On 1 January 2013, the band announced that they had left their initial management company LDH and their record label Rhythm Zone after their bassist, Takuya Ihara, withdrew from the band on December 31, 2012
 On December 3, 2013, it was announced that their guitarist, Duran, had left as well.
 On January 10, 2014, they changed their name to Rootless. In the same year, they became affiliated with Being Inc.
 On December 28, 2015, the band announced their dissolution.

Discography

Singles

Mini albums

Album

Singles

References

External links 
 
 
 野畑 慎 オフィシャルブログ Powered by Ameba（2009年4月 - 2010年10月）
 The ROOTLESS オフィシャルブログ Powered by Ameba（2010年10月 - 2013年3月）

Musical groups established in 2009
Japanese rock music groups